Mirko Martucci (born 19 February 1988) is an Italian footballer.

Biography
Born in Liestal, Basel-Landschaft, Switzerland, Martucci started his career at Italian Serie D team Alessandria and in 2006 left for Genoa youth team. In July 2008 he left for Arezzo but he then left for SPAL along with Rivaldo González, in co-ownership deal for a peppercorn fee of €500 each (€1,000 in total). In June 2010 Genoa gave up the remain 50% registration rights to SPAL. He also spent 2009–10 season at Viareggio. On 31 August 2010 he joined Cosenza.

References

External links
 Football.it Profile 
 
 Cosenza Profile  

Italian footballers
U.S. Alessandria Calcio 1912 players
Genoa C.F.C. players
S.P.A.L. players
F.C. Esperia Viareggio players
Cosenza Calcio players
Association football midfielders
Sportspeople from Basel-Landschaft
1988 births
Living people
People from Liestal
Acqui U.S. 1911 players